Xeroleuca is a genus of air-breathing land snails, a pulmonate gastropod in the subfamily Helicellinae of the family Geomitridae, the typical snails.

It contains the following species:
 Xeroleuca degenerans (Mousson, 1873)
 Xeroleuca mogadorensis (Bourguignat, 1863)
 Xeroleuca mograbina (Morelet, 1852)
 Xeroleuca privatiana (Pallary, 1918)
 Xeroleuca renati (Dautzenberg, 1894) 
 Xeroleuca turcica (Holten, 1802)
Taxa inquirenda
 Xeroleuca babelis Pallary, 1920 (taxon inquirendum)
 Xeroleuca brulardi Pallary, 1913 (taxon inquirendum)
 Xeroleuca chabertiana Pallary, 1923 (taxon inquirendum)
 Xeroleuca rebiana Pallary, 1913

References 

 Morelet, A., 1852. Testa nova Algeriensa. Coquilles nouvelles d'Algérie. Journal de Conchyliologie 3: 61-64
 Kobelt, W. (1877). Zusätze und Berichtigungen zu meinem Catalog der im europäischen Faunengebiete lebenden Binnenconchylien. Jahrbücher der Deutschen Malakozoologischen Gesellschaft. 4: 14–45.
 Pallary, P. (1929). Première addition à la faune malacologique de la Syrie. Mémoires présentés a l'Institut d'Égypte, 12: 1-43, pl. 1-3. Le Caire.
 Bank, R. A. (2017). Classification of the Recent terrestrial Gastropoda of the World. Last update: July 16th, 2017

External links
 Risso A. (1826). Histoire naturelle des principales productions de l'Europe méridionale et particulièrement de celles des environs de Nice et des Alpes Maritimes, vol. 4. Paris: Levrault. vii + 439 pp., pls 1-12
 Bouaziz-Yahiatene, H., Inäbnit, T., Medjdoub-Bensaad, F., Colomba, M. S., Sparacio, I., Gregorini, A., Liberto, F. & Neubert, E. (2019). Revisited – the species of Tweeting vineyard snails, genus Cantareus Risso, 1826 (Stylommatophora, Helicidae, Helicinae, Otalini). ZooKeys. 876: 1-26.

Geomitridae
Gastropod genera